Choragudi is a village Krishna District of the Indian state of Andhra Pradesh. It is under Pamidimukkala mandal of Nuzvid revenue division.

References

Villages in Krishna district